The 2020–21 season was the 114th season in the existence of Sevilla FC and the club's 20th consecutive season in the top flight of Spanish football. In addition to the domestic league, Sevilla participated in this season's editions of the Copa del Rey, and the UEFA Super Cup and also participated in the UEFA Champions League. The season covered the period from 22 August 2020 to 30 June 2021, with the late start to the season due to the COVID-19 pandemic in Spain.

Kits
On 21 May 2018, Sevilla announced a new three-year kit supply contract with American sportswear giant Nike from 2018–2021. On 4 August 2020, Sevilla FC extended its relationship with kit supplier Nike. The current contract, which ends in 2021, will now extend for the 2021–22 season.

Players
As of 23 May 2021.

Transfers and loans

Transfers In

Transfers Out

Loans Out

Pre-season and friendlies

Competitions

Overview

La Liga

League table

Results summary

Results by round

Matches
The league fixtures were announced on 31 August 2020.

Copa del Rey

UEFA Champions League

Group stage

The group stage draw was held on 1 October 2020.

Knockout phase

Round of 16
The draw for the round of 16 was held on 14 December 2020.

UEFA Super Cup

Statistics

Squad appearances and goals
Last updated on 23 May 2021.

|-
! colspan=14 style=background:#dcdcdc; text-align:center|Goalkeepers

|-
! colspan=14 style=background:#dcdcdc; text-align:center|Defenders

|-
! colspan=14 style=background:#dcdcdc; text-align:center|Midfielders

|-
! colspan=14 style=background:#dcdcdc; text-align:center|Forwards

|-
! colspan=14 style=background:#dcdcdc; text-align:center|Players who have made an appearance this season but have left the club

|}

Goalscorers

Clean sheets
Last updated on 23 May 2021

Disciplinary record

Includes all competitive matches.

Notes

References

External links

Sevilla FC seasons
Sevilla FC
Sevilla FC